Sophia Mirza (1973–25 November 2005) was a woman in the United Kingdom who had chronic fatigue syndrome (also known as CFS, myalgic encephalomyalitis, ME, and ME/CFS) listed as a contributing to her death. The inquest recorded the cause of death as "renal failure as a result of chronic fatigue syndrome". Advocacy groups such as Invest in ME and the ME Association say that Mirza's inquest result shows that ME/CFS is a neurological illness.

Background
Mirza was born in the United Kingdom in 1973, one of four children to Irish/Asian parents.  She visited Africa at the age of 19, traveling and working throughout the continent and was infected with malaria twice while there. At the age of 26 Mirza fell ill with what appeared to be the flu and shortly afterward became convalescent.

In July 2003 Mirza was forceably removed from her home and sectioned for two weeks by her doctors, who had come to believe her condition was psychosomatic, an action which her mother and sister believed severely worsened her condition. Her mother and sister stated that Mirza's physical symptoms were treated as a mental condition rather than a physical illness, and her caregiver mother was accused of 'enabling' her.

Death
For two years following her sectioning, Mirza's health deteriorated. By September 2005 she took a significant turn for the worse, developing intolerance to most of the food she consumed, ear infection and severe pain, and was only able to consume a small amount of water.  Mirza died on 25 November 2005.  Initial autopsy results were inconclusive for her cause of death, but a second autopsy and the results of an inquest released on 13 June 2006 determined the cause of death to be "acute anueric kidney failure due to dehydration caused by CFS". Though initially reported by New Scientist as the first death worldwide ascribed to CFS, the magazine later acknowledged that other deaths had been directly attributed to CFS in the United States and Australia. Fatalities have been attributed to CFS or ME since at least 1956.

Inquest 
An official inquest was held to determine Mirza's cause of death, including an autopsy. The coroner concluded Mirza died as a result of CFS. Other possible causes that were considered and eliminated were sleep apnea, drug use, and others that could have been consistent with the autopsy results. A neuropathologist testified at the inquest that four out of five of Mirza's dorsal root ganglia − structures in the spinal cord involved in perceptions of touch, temperature, body position and pain − showed abnormalities and evidence of inflammation. A neurologist who consulted on the inquest stated the changes in the spinal cord may have been the cause of the symptoms Mirza experienced as part of her ME/CFS.

According to the BBC, advocacy groups such as the ME Association saw the inquest's verdict as proof that Mirza's condition was neurological.

See also

 List of people with chronic fatigue syndrome
 Lynn Gilderdale

References 

2005 deaths
People from Brighton
1973 births
People with chronic fatigue syndrome